Roger Federer defeated Marcos Baghdatis in the final, 5–7, 7–5, 6–0, 6–2 to win the men's singles tennis title at the 2006 Australian Open. It was his second Australian Open title and his seventh major title overall. Baghdatis became the first  Cypriot to reach a major final.

Marat Safin was the reigning champion, but withdrew due to injury.

Marcos Baghdatis became the first player from Cyprus to reach the final of a Grand Slam.

Seeds

Qualifying

Draw

Finals

Top half

Section 1

Section 2

Section 3

Section 4

Bottom half

Section 5

Section 6

Section 7

Section 8

References

External links
 Association of Tennis Professionals (ATP) – 2006 Australian Open Men's Singles draw
 2006 Australian Open – Men's draws and results at the International Tennis Federation

Men's singles
Australian Open (tennis) by year – Men's singles